Who Wants to Kill Sara? is a 1992 Italian giallo film  written and directed by Gianpaolo Tescari and starring Nancy Brilli.

Plot

Divorce attorney Sara Lancetti, soon to be married, starts getting notes and phone calls threatening her life if she marries. Hoping to identify the person who made the threats, she tries to track down all her former boyfriends.

Cast 
Nancy Brilli as Sara Lancetti
Giulio Scarpati as Max Altieri
Claudio Bigagli as Daniele
Antonella Lualdi as Miss Toscano
Marie Laforêt as Sara's mother
 Luciano Bartoli  as Riccardo  
Maurizio Donadoni as Andrea
 Antonella Fattori  as Manuela
 Stéphane Ferrara  as Nicolas
François Perrot as Gomez

See also   
 List of Italian films of 1992

References

External links

1992 crime thriller films
Giallo films
1990s Italian-language films
1990s Italian films